The Promise is the eighteenth studio album by American band Earth, Wind & Fire released in May 2003 on Kalimba Music. The album peaked at No. 19 on the Billboard Top R&B/Hip-Hop Albums chart and No. 5 on the Billboard Top Independent Albums chart.

Overview 
The Promise was executively produced by Maurice White. Artists such as Angie Stone, The Emotions, Gerald Albright and Paulinho Da Costa featured on the LP. The album's cover art was also designed by Morito Suzuki.

"Where Do We Go from Here" and "Dirty" were originally recorded during the I Am sessions and remixed for this album. "Dirty", in particular, in its original form with blues legend Junior Wells, already appeared on the 1992 box-set The Eternal Dance.

Singles 
The track "All in the Way" featuring The Emotions reached No. 13 on the Billboard Adult R&B Songs chart and No. 25 on the Billboard Adult Contemporary chart.

The songs, "Never" and "Why?" peaked at Nos. 17 and 19, respectively, on the Billboard Smooth Jazz Songs chart.
"Hold Me", produced and written by Tim & Bob, reached No. 28 on the Billboard Adult R&B Songs chart. "Hold Me" was also Grammy nominated for Best Traditional R&B Vocal Performance.

Critical reception 

People called The Promise a "musically rich 17-track set (including five trademark instrumental interludes) that blows away most of today’s R&B." With a three out of five star rating Chairman Mao of Blender proclaimed that EWF "maintains their trademark buoyancy on a classy collection of mid-tempo numbers and sweeping ballads." Rob Theakston of AllMusic gave a three out of five star rating and declared the album is "extremely soulful and soothing". With a 3.5 out of five star rating Steve Jones of USA Today wrote "with horn-kissed ballads and infectious jazz funk grooves, the band seems to have regained its spark". Renee Graham of the Boston Globe noted that "unfussy and sincere, this is well-crafted R&B for grown ups".
David Peschek of The Guardian also gave a 4 out of five star rating and described The Promise as "17 tracks of immaculately smooth, meticulously detailed mid-tempo pop-soul and thoroughly intoxicating in its lushness."

Track listing

Personnel 

Maurice White – lead and background vocals, kalimba, producer, executive producer, horn arrangements, vocal producer
Tim Kelley – mixer, arranger, producer, keyboards, drum programming
Bob Robinson – arranger, producer, piano, guitar
Verdine White – bass
Philip Bailey – lead and background vocals
Ralph Johnson – percussion, background vocals, producer, drum programming
B. David Whitworth – background vocals
Tom Mgrdichian – keyboards, string arrangements
Sir Alexander Dutkewych – guitar, harp on "Dirty"
John Paris – drums
Greg "G-Mo" Moore – guitar
Robert Brookins – keyboards, producer, drum programming
Daniel de los Reyes – percussion
Gary Bias – flute, saxophone
Reggie Young – trombone
Ray Brown – trumpet, flugelhorn, horn arrangements, soloist
Darrell Crooks – guitar
Paulinho Da Costa – percussion
Gary Grant – trumpet
Jerry Hey – trumpet, horn arrangements
Sheila Hutchinson – background vocals
Tollak Ollestad – harmonica
Wayne Linsey – keyboards
Raymond Crossley – keyboards
Gregory Curtis – keyboards, background vocals, producer, engineer, drum programming
Andy Martin – trombone
Howard McCrary – background vocals
Michael "Patches" Stewart – trumpet, flugelhorn
Wanda Vaughn – lead and background vocals
Wayne Vaughn – drums, keyboards, background vocals, producer, engineer, horn arrangements, vocal producer
Eric Walls – guitar

Production 
Myron McKinley – rhythm arrangements
Dave Dolimar – engineer
Preston Glass – producer, keyboard programming
Steve Hall – mastering
Andy Haller – engineer
Cameron Marcarelli – engineer, drum programming, assistant engineer
Wallace Mercer – engineer
Richard Salvato – production coordination
Dexter Simmons – mixing
Ben Wright – horn arrangements
:ja:Morito Suzuki – cover design

Charts 

Singles

References 

2003 albums
Earth, Wind & Fire albums
Kalimba Music albums
Albums produced by Maurice White
Albums produced by Tim & Bob
Albums produced by Philip Bailey
Neo soul albums
Hip hop soul albums